CKBN-FM is a french language community radio station that operates at 90.5 FM in Bécancour, Quebec, Canada. The station was licensed in 2004, and started operations on May 8, 2007. It was rebranded as "VIA 90.5" on August 20, 2018.  It's also broadcasting over HD Radio, on 90.1-1. 

The station is a member of the Association des radiodiffuseurs communautaires du Québec.

References

External links
www.ckbn.ca
 

Kbn
Kbn
Kbn
Radio stations established in 2004
2004 establishments in Quebec